William Lane (1746–1814) was a publisher and bookseller in London in the late 18th century best known now for his founding of the wildly successful Minerva Press.

Career
Around 1790 Lane established the Minerva Printing Press in Cree Church Lane, Leadenhall Street, moving ca.1792 to no. 31 Leadenhall Street. The Minerva Press issued works by Courtney Melmoth and others. Subscribers to Lane's Circulating Library (established circa 1774) included Leigh Hunt. Around 1799 John Darling and Anthony King Newman joined Lane as "Lane, Darling, Newman & Co." In 1804 Lane retired and Newman took over the business.

Notes

References

See also
List of Minerva Press authors
Minerva Press

External links
 
 

Publishers (people) from London
English booksellers
Commercial circulating libraries
1746 births
1814 deaths